Maximum Strength is the tenth solo studio album by American rapper KRS-One. It was released on June 10, 2008 via Koch Records. Production was handled by Duane "DaRock" Ramos, James Desmond, Dirt, Oh No and Ser Kenoe, with Simone Parker serving as executive producer. The name Maximum Strength was originally the title for an album recorded by KRS-One in 1998-1999 for Jive Records that still remains unreleased. When promoting this album in 2008 it was said to finally be a release of the shelved LP and the label even posted track lists and cover very different from the final release.

The album peaked at number 78 on the Billboard Top R&B/Hip-Hop Albums in the US.

Track listing

Personnel
Lawrence "KRS-One" Parker – lyrics, vocals
Duane Ramos – producer (tracks: 1-3, 5, 8-12)
James Desmond – producer (tracks: 2, 5)
Ser Kenoe – producer (track 3)
Dirt – producer (track 4)
Michael "Oh No" Jackson – producer (track 6)
Arnold Mischkulnig – mixing, mastering
Bob Perry – mixing, mastering
Simone G. Parker – executive producer 
Andrew Kelley – art direction, design
Scott "DJ Scott La Rock" Sterling – overseen by

Charts

References

2008 albums
KRS-One albums
E1 Music albums
MNRK Music Group albums
Albums produced by Oh No (musician)